Oakwood School is a K-12 co-educational independent day school located in the San Fernando Valley region of Los Angeles, California.

The school consists of two campuses: the elementary school campus in Studio City, and the secondary school campus in North Hollywood. The school was founded in 1951 by a small group of parents who were unhappy with other schools available and wanted to create a school where artistic ideals and educational goals could be met with the utmost respect and support for students.

Notable people

Alumni 
Alex Ebert, Golden Globe and Grammy-winning musician
Chris O'Loughlin (born 1967), Olympic fencer
Chris Pine
Moon Zappa
Zoey Deutch
Lily-Rose Depp
Todd Haynes
Elizabeth McGovern
Mitchell Butler
Jennifer Grey
 Andrew Gold
 Wendy Waldman
 Mark Wexler
 Wolfgang Van Halen

Faculty 
 Sarah Culberson - Sierra Leonean princess

References

External links
 

Private K-12 schools in Los Angeles County, California
High schools in the San Fernando Valley
Educational institutions established in 1951
North Hollywood, Los Angeles
Studio City, Los Angeles
1951 establishments in California